David Storl (born 27 July 1990) is a German track and field athlete who specialises in the shot put. He was successful on the youth and junior athletics circuit, winning gold medals at the World Youth Championships and World Junior Championships. Storl won his first senior medal, a silver, at the 2011 European Athletics Indoor Championships.

He held the world junior record of 22.73 m with the 6 kg shot. His personal best with the senior implement is 22.20 m.

He won the gold medal in the shot put competition at the 2011 World Championships in Athletics, and the Silver Medal at the 2012 Summer Olympics.

Storl is one of only ten athletes (along with Valerie Adams, Usain Bolt, Veronica Campbell-Brown, Jacques Freitag, Yelena Isinbayeva, Kirani James, Jana Pittman, Dani Samuels and Faith Kipyegon) to win world championships at the youth, junior, and senior level of an athletic event.

Storl uses the glide technique for shot putting.

Career
Storl first became involved in athletics as a child when his grandfather suggested he join the local club, VfL Rochlitzer Berg. Initially a decathlon specialist, the death of his personal coach in 2006 led him to focus exclusively on the shot put and discus throwing events. At the age of 16, he won the gold medal at the 2007 World Youth Championships with a personal best and German under-18 record throw of 21.40 metres (using the lighter 5 kg shot for youths).

The following year he competed with the 6 kg junior implement and won the shot put title at the 2008 World Junior Championships in Athletics with a mark of 21.08 m, which made him the fourth-best junior of all time. In 2009, he began using the full senior weight (7.26 kg) in the indoor season and achieved a best of 19.48 m. Returning to the junior 6 kg shot in the outdoor season, he became the first ever junior athlete to throw beyond 22 metres in Mannheim, setting consecutive world junior records of 22.18 m and then 22.34 m. A month later he increased this mark to 22.73 m in Osterode (putting some distance between himself and the Edis Elkasevic's former record of 21.96 m), and went on to win the 2009 European Junior title with a championships record of 22.40 m. Having placed third at the 2009 German Athletics Championships and achieved the senior international "A" standard with a personal best throw of 20.43 m, he was selected for the 2009 World Championships in Athletics in Berlin. He ended his first senior international appearance in 15th place in the qualifying rounds.

The 2010 season was his first as a senior athlete and he was runner-up at the Indoor and Outdoor German Championships. At the 2010 IAAF World Indoor Championships, he came seventh while compatriot Ralf Bartels won the bronze. Storl represented Germany at the 2010 European Athletics Championships and managed fourth place. That year he achieved senior personal bests of 20.77 m both outdoors and indoors. He defeated Bartels to win the German indoor title in 2011, but the places were reversed at the 2011 European Athletics Indoor Championships, although Storl's silver medal was his first major senior medal.

He surpassed the 21-metre mark in Gothenburg in June with a throw of 21.03 m and topped the podium at both the 2011 European Team Championships and 2011 European Athletics U23 Championships, setting championship records of 20.81 m and 20.45 m in the process. With Bartels not competing, Storl won his first outdoor senior national title in July. He  added to his best mark with a throw of 21.05 m at the Weltklasse hinterm Deich meeting.

On 12 August 2014, Storl won his second successive European Athletics Championships gold medal with a throw of 21.42m.

Storl surpassed the 22-metre mark on 9 July 2015 in Lausanne with a winning throw of 22.20m, making it his new personal best.

Achievements

References

External links

 
 
 
 
 
 
 

1990 births
Living people
People from Rochlitz
Sportspeople from Saxony
German male shot putters
Olympic male shot putters
Olympic athletes of Germany
Olympic silver medalists for Germany
Olympic silver medalists in athletics (track and field)
Athletes (track and field) at the 2012 Summer Olympics
Athletes (track and field) at the 2016 Summer Olympics
Medalists at the 2012 Summer Olympics
World Athletics Championships athletes for Germany
World Athletics Championships winners
World Athletics Championships medalists
World Athletics U20 Championships winners
World Youth Championships in Athletics winners
IAAF Continental Cup winners
European Athletics Championships winners
European Athletics Championships medalists
European Athletics Indoor Championships winners
German national athletics champions
European Athletics Rising Star of the Year winners
SC DHfK Leipzig athletes